Clydesdale was a Scottish retailer of electrical goods. At one point, it was Scotland's largest electrical retailer.  The company went into liquidation in January 1994. Various assets were purchased by Scottish Power, Granada UK Rental and other companies.

References

Consumer electronics retailers of the United Kingdom
Defunct retail companies of the United Kingdom
Retail companies of Scotland
Companies based in Glasgow
Retail companies disestablished in 1994
Defunct companies of Scotland
1994 disestablishments in Scotland
British companies disestablished in 1994